Marie and Robert Weatherall were a married couple who collaborated in translating the work of Karel Čapek into English.
 
Marie Weatherall, née Isakovicsová (1897 – 1972) was from Czechoslovakia. Educated at Prague University, Marie had obtained her doctorate and married Robert Weatherall by 1927, when she published an article on Walter Pater in a Czechoslovak philological journal.

Robert Weatherall (1899 – 27 September 1973, Barham, Kent) was educated at Cambridge University before becoming a biology master at Rugby School. Weatherall subsequently taught at Eton College. An active participant in the social hygiene movement, he was on the board of the British Social Biology Council for nearly four decades, and co-editor of their journal Biology and Human Affairs. In 1944, as secretary of the Education Advisory Board of the Social Hygiene Council, Weatherall proposed the setting up of a national public service to collect, wash and return diapers within 24 hours.

Translations
(incomplete list)
Jan Welzl, "The Quest for Polar Treasures" Translated by M & R weatherall, London, George Allen & Unwin Ltd., 1933 
Karel Čapek, War with the Newts. Translated by M. & R. Weatherall, New York, G.P. Putnam & Sons, 1937
Tomáš Garrigue Masaryk and Karel Čapek, Masaryk on thought and life : conversations with Karel Čapek; translated from the Czech by M. & R. Weatherall, London: G. Allen & Unwin, 1938
Karel Čapek, I had a dog and a cat, translated by M. & R. Weatherall, 1940
Karel Čapek, Three novels: Hordubal, An ordinary life, Meteor. Tr. by M. and R. Weatherall, 1948

References

Married couples
Translators from Czech
Translators to English
Karel Čapek